Portovelo Canton is a canton of Ecuador, located in the El Oro Province.  Its capital is the town of Portovelo.  Its population at the 2001 census was 11,024.

Demographics
Ethnic groups as of the Ecuadorian census of 2010:
Mestizo  69.7%
Montubio  18.0%
White  7.6%
Afro-Ecuadorian  4.3%
Indigenous  0.1%
Other  0.2%

References

Cantons of El Oro Province